The International Space University (ISU) is dedicated to the discovery, research, and development of outer space and its applications for peaceful purposes, through international and multidisciplinary education and research programs. ISU was founded in 1987 and is registered in France and in the US as a non profit organisation. The university offers a one or two-year Master in Space Studies (MSS) in Strasbourg and shorter professional development programs across the world. The latter include an itinerant nine-week Space Studies Program (SSP), a five-week Southern Hemisphere SSP in partnership with the University of South Australia, a 6-week Commercial Space graduate certificate in partnership with the Florida Institute of Technology, and one-week Executive Space Courses in Australia, Europe and the USA.

The International Space University Central Campus and global headquarters are located in Illkirch-Graffenstaden near Strasbourg, France. ISU was founded on the "3-Is" philosophy providing an Interdisciplinary, Intercultural, and International environment for educating and training space professionals and post-graduate students. As of April 2020, there were over 5000 ISU alumni from 109 countries.  In November 2017 the International Space University hosted a conference in Strasbourg that led to the formation of the Moon Village Association. The ISU faculty members include astronauts, space agency leaders, space engineers, space scientists, managers, and experts in space law and policy comprising an international collection of experts in technical and non-technical space-related fields.

The Chancellor of the International Space University is Pascale Ehrenfreund, Chair of the German Aerospace Center (DLR) Executive Board and President of the International Astronautical Federation (IAF). She was preceded by Apollo astronaut Buzz Aldrin, who succeeded then–European Space Agency Director-General Jean-Jacques Dordain and acclaimed science fiction author Arthur C. Clarke, in 2004. The sixth President of the International Space University is Juan de Dalmau who succeeded Prof. Walter Peeters, in September 2018.

History
In 1985, four young space enthusiasts created the Space Generation Foundation, dedicated to fostering a sense of identity for those people born since the beginning of the space era. The ISU founders are Peter Diamandis, one of the founders of SEDS and a medical doctor with a Master's in aerospace engineering from MIT; Todd Hawley, a graduate from Space Policy Institute at George Washington University; Robert D. Richards, an engineer and physicist, and former assistant of the well-known astrophysicist Carl Sagan and Christopher D. Mau, a venture capitalist living and working in Boston at the time. The four men generated a series of novel ideas from which a "Space University" was exceptionally well received. The idea garnered the support of a number of important personalities in the space field, including Prof. U.R. Rao, president of the Indian Space Research Organization; Dr. Harrison Schmitt, an Apollo 17 astronaut and former senator; Dr. Burton Edelson, Associate Administrator of NASA for Space, Science, and Applications; Dr. Gerard K. O'Neill from the Space Studies Institute; space pioneer Prof. Hermann Oberth; and Arthur C. Clarke, the visionary writer, along with many others.

This initiative was further developed and presented to the Advances in the Astronautical Sciences (AAS) Meeting dedicated to Aerospace Century XXI   in Boulder, Colorado in 1986. The following year, a three-day Founding Conference convened at the Massachusetts Institute of Technology (MIT) from 10 to 12 April 1987. These dates were chosen to commemorate the flight of Yuri Gagarin (12 April 1961), the first human in space. 
The Founding Conference culminated in the formal creation of the International Space University, and established it as a 501(c)3 non-profit educational organization in the state of Massachusetts, USA. The first ISU Summer Session Program (SSP) took place at MIT from 20 June to 20 August 1988 with the support of the major space agencies. A significant announcement in an article dating 5 July 1988, in the Christian Science Monitor introduced the four founders and their novel and exciting venture. In a ceremonial gesture, the first international participants in the summer session were led by the four founders in a walk across the Charles River from MIT in Cambridge to Boston. The artwork for the first brochure was made by Pat Rawlings and is still in use today. The original offices of the fledgling ISU were  located in a Victorian townhouse overlooking bustling Kenmore Square in Boston.

Following an international competition for a host city for the Central Campus, the ISU home base moved from Massachusetts to Illkirch-Graffenstaden in the Urban Community of Strasbourg, France, in 1994. ISU is now a non-profit association registered in Alsace (France), and is still registered in the US as a 501(c)3 non-profit educational organization. The Governing Members of ISU are international organizations, industries, space agencies, academic institutions, and individual members.

The French Ministry of Education formally recognized ISU as an institute of higher education in 2004
The International Space University has had permanent observer status with the United Nations Committee on the Peaceful Uses of Outer Space (COPUOS) of the United Nations Office for Outer Space Affairs since 1998. ISU was also granted full membership of the Space Agency Forum (SAF) in 1995. ISU is a member of the International Astronautical Federation (IAF) and has been invited to contribute to a number of international activities including the Asia-Pacific Regional Space Agency Forum, the IAF Symposium on "Bringing Space into Education", the World Space Workshop on Education, and the National Science Week Steering Committee.

To ensure that the programs being offered meet the demands of a rapidly changing space sector, ISU regularly conducts surveys to ascertain the latest educational needs of the global space enterprises and updates its programs accordingly. The milestones of the history of ISU are noted in the Table below:

Campus
ISU originally evolved in a geographically decentralized way, with summer sessions convened in a different country each year. In 1994 the Central Campus was established in Strasbourg, Alsace, France, because of its central European location and unique character. During the first years, the Master of Science classes took place in the Pôle API of the École Nationale Supérieure de Physique de Strasbourg.

Since 2002 ISU has had its own building, thanks to the support of the local authorities. The Central Campus is now located in the Parc d'Innovation of Illkirch-Graffenstaden just south of Strasbourg, less than 30 minutes from the city centre by public transportation.

Organization and administration
ISU's organizational structure includes a Board of Advisors, chaired by the Chancellor, and a board of trustees elected by the Governing Membership of the ISU. The Board of Trustees determines ISU's overall objectives, oversees the university's affairs and appoints the ISU President. The President is supported by an executive committee, Academic Staff (who prepare and deliver ISU programs) and Administrative Staff (responsible for the daily operation of the Institution). The Academic Staff are led by the Dean, who is supported by staff responsible for ISU's academic programs (Masters and SSP) and library services. The Academic Council of ISU is responsible for ensuring the academic quality of ISU's teaching and research activities. ISU academic staff include a number of Resident Faculty, augmented by other Faculty and Lecturers as needed for the programs.

Academics
The programs offered by ISU are dedicated to the space-related fields, as well as sports programs.

Programs delivered each year on a regular basis
 A twelve-month Master of Science in Space Studies (MSS)
 A two-month Space Studies Program (SSP)
 A five-week Southern Hemisphere Summer Space Studies Program (SHSSP)
 A one-week Executive Space Course (ESC) providing a basic introduction to space topics for corporates executives.

Short programs delivered on demand
 Professional Development Programs
 Workshops
 Short Courses
 Forums

Participation in these programs is open to individuals and institutions of all nationalities.

Masters of Science
The Master of Science in Space Studies (MSS) and the Master of Science in Space Management (MSM) are graduate-level degree programs in the space field. These one-year degree programs include a three-month professional internship and several professional visits. The main elements of the Masters are:
 Lectures covering all major disciplines related to space, with corresponding workshops and roundtables,
 Lectures on contemporary space-related issues and events which as a whole provide an interdisciplinary and intercultural education,
 Team Projects involving most, if not all, of those disciplines (see Table below),
 Individual Projects performed during the academic year and during an internship period,
 Professional Visits and participation to ISU Annual Symposium,
 Specific skills training.

Space Studies Program
The Space Studies Program (SSP) is an intense two-month course for postgraduate students and professionals of all disciplines. The curriculum covers the principal space related fields, both non-technical and technical and ranges from policy and law, business and management and humanities to life sciences, engineering, physical sciences and space applications. The shared experience of an international, interactive working environment is an ideal networking forum leading to the creation of an extensive, international, multidisciplinary professional network.

Each year the SSP convenes in a different location around the world. The SSP curriculum includes:
 Core Lectures covering fundamental concepts across all relevant disciplines,
 Theme days presenting keys/issues of space with an interdisciplinary approach,
 Hands-on workshops providing practical applications of the concepts presented in the lectures,
 Departmental Activities of the seven SSP departments providing in-depth lectures & workshops, professional visits, and individual research projects,
 Team Projects in which the SSP participants address a relevant space topic as an international, interdisciplinary, and intercultural team.

Future Space Studies Programs
Future Space Studies programs are planned for:
 2020: Postponed to 2021 in Granada. An online experience is offered during the summer of 2020: the Interactive Space Program (ISP).
 2021: Granada, Spain.
 2023: São José dos Campos, Brazil.

Past Space Studies Programs, Locations and Team Projects

Southern Hemisphere Summer Space Program
The Southern Hemisphere Summer Space Program (SH-SSP) is a five weeks course open to undergraduate students and professionals of all disciplines with space interest. As in all ISU programs, the curriculum covers not only space-related fields and space applications but also non-technical fields such as policy, law, space business, and management techniques.

The intention of a second program, next to the established SSP program of ISU, was to extend the offering to participants of the Southern Hemisphere, in line with the local summer holidays, but participants from all nations are welcomed.

The program is offered in partnership with the University of South Australia in Adelaide (Mawson Lakes Campus) and benefits from scholarship support from the Australian Space Research Program. The intention is to have the program iterating to different locations in the Southern Hemisphere, in particular in Africa and South America, but regularly returning to Australia.

Previous White Paper executive summaries and full reports are available for download from the ISU Library.

Executive Space Course
The Executive Space Course (ESC) provides an overview of space and of space-related subjects for professionals of diverse backgrounds, including marketing, finance, law, and contract management, intended to improve their communication with technical colleagues.

Academic facilities

Library
Since 1995, the collection of the ISU Library has grown to reach about 9,000 space-related documents. The collection supports the interdisciplinary aspects of the courses and includes subjects like space-related business and management, space policy and law, international cooperation, remote sensing and Earth observation, telecommunication, space engineering, space mission design, astronomy, space life sciences, and space medicine. The Library also features news about space, information from space agencies and research institutes around the world, and awareness and alerting services from journals. RSS feeds can be used to follow the library's new acquisitions. Interested people may subscribe to the feeds for receiving regular updates about books, electronic documents, or Team Projects reports that are added to the online catalog.

Training facilities

With the strong support from ESA, the following facilities were installed and put into operation:

Astronomy Observatory
Several optical and radio telescopes at ISU give students the opportunity of performing observations as well as the necessary analysis, which introduces them to typical techniques of astrophysical research and gives them a first-hand experience in the study of the invisible Universe.

ESA-Dresden Radio Telescope
The satellite television Ku band (10–12 GHz) is suitable to perform observations of the Sun and the Moon, using conventional material, such as a 1.2-meter parabolic dish, placed on the roof of the ISU building. This telescope, developed under ESA contract by the Fraunhofer Institute for Integrated Circuits in Dresden for use in schools, has been given to ISU by ESA. It is capable of providing properly calibrated data and hence allows to determine the surface temperatures of the Sun and the Moon. Since its in-depth testing by ISU Masters students, it has been extensively used in the framework of workshops and individual student projects. With the ESA-Dresden Radio Telescope, the students can experience and perform all the necessary steps from observation, calibration, and data reduction to the interpretation and evaluation of the results.

ESA-Haystack Radio Telescope
The Haystack Observatory, run by MIT, developed a Small Radio Telescope (SRT) for educational purposes, consisting of a 2.3-meter diameter standard satellite dish antenna. This radio telescope operates at a 1.42  GHz frequency (21-cm wavelength) where hydrogen atoms emit a strong spectral line. This allows radio astronomers to detect hydrogen, the most abundant element of the Universe. One SRT has been donated to ISU by ESA and is operational since 2009. This new asset, named the ESA-Haystack Radio Telescope, provides the students with the opportunity of performing observations of astronomical objects even outside the Solar System.

Concurrent Design Facility (CDF)
When the European Space Research and Technology Centre (ESTEC) acquired a new Concurrent Design Facility, its initial CDF was set up at the ISU Central Campus in 2008. The CDF brings the Masters's students the possibility of familiarizing themselves with concurrent engineering and its application processes through workshops and assignments. These hands-on activities always have double-oriented tasks, by combining the CDF process with the development of space-related topics. As the usefulness of concurrent engineering extends much further than space mission design, the use of the ISU CDF for design processes in other industry fields than space is also under consideration.

GENSO Tracking Ground Station
A fully automated satellite tracking station is installed at ISU since 2008. This ground station provides several hands-on training opportunities for the Masters' students, as satellite communication is now a reality at ISU. The ISU Tracking Ground Station was built in the scope of the Global Educational Network for Satellite Operations (GENSO) project, an endeavor involving students worldwide and promoted by the International Space Education Board (ISEB), an organization including the educational departments of some of the major space agencies worldwide.

Human Performance in Space Laboratory
Established in 2009, the ISU Human Spaceflight Laboratory includes a rotating chair, the training model of the ultrasound echocardiograph, and body motion analysis equipment that flew on Mir in 1988, and the flight model of the neuroscience Pocket equipment that flew on the Space Shuttle STS-51G mission. This equipment was all donated by CNES. In addition, NASA has loaned a training model of the ISS Advanced Life Support Pack (ALSP) and ESA has loaned a training model of the ISS 3DSPACE experiment. The Human Spaceflight Laboratory is also equipped with a clinostat, an autoclave, a laminar flow cabinet, microscopes, medical diagnosis and surgery tools, and other laboratory equipment to provide realistic hands-on training on the experiments performed in space by astronauts.

Self Deployable Habitat for Extreme Environments (SHEE)
The goal of the Self Deployable Habitat for Extreme Environments (SHEE) is to develop a deployable space analog habitat demonstrating technologies and architecture that may one day be used in extreme environment habitats on the Earth, Moon, and Mars. This project is a partnership between seven different companies and institutions representing five different European nations. This habitat is designed to support two "astronauts" for missions of up to two weeks in duration. Construction was completed in July 2015, after which the SHEE was shipped to ISU for validation and testing. ISU faculty and students will spend the next six months evaluating the habitat and delivering a report on their findings to the European Commission. The SHEE will live in the ISU High Bay until April 2016 when it will take part in a Mars Analog mission called Moonwalk in Rio Tinto, Spain.

Annual symposium

Up until 2013, an annual ISU symposium was convened to address a topic with broad interest both with the space industry and among the space agencies. The Symposium has been suspended until further notice. Other international conference-style events are being planned and convened on the ISU campus. Refer to the ISU web site for more details. The following table presents the topics covered from 1996 to 2013.

Notable ISU staff

Founders
Peter Diamandis
Todd B. Hawley
Robert D. Richards
Christopher D. Mau

Chancellors
 1987–2004: Arthur C. Clarke
 2004–2015: Jean-Jacques Dordain
 2015–2018: Buzz Aldrin
 2018–present: Pascale Ehrenfreund

Presidents
 1991–1994: George Van Reeth
 1994–1998: Roland Doré
 1998–2004: Karl Doetsch
 2004–2011: Michael Simpson
 2011–2018: Walter Peeters
 2018–2021: Juan De Dalmau
 2021-present:  Pascale Ehrenfreund

Notable faculty
 Ben Finney, 1994-2003 co-chair of Space and Society department
 Dustin Bates, 2006 ISU Summer Session Program Teaching Associate

Astronauts
 Oleg Atkov, Russian Railways, Faculty
 James H. Newman, NASA, the first ISU alumnus (SSP 1989) to go into space
 Jeffrey Hoffman, NASA & MIT, Faculty
 Chiaki Mukai, JAXA, Faculty
 Reinhold Ewald, ESA, lecturer
 Jean-Jacques Favier, CNES, lecturer
 Robert Thirsk, CSA, lecturer
 Soyeon Yi, KARI, lecturer, the first astronaut to attend ISU (SSP 2009)
 Anousheh Ansari, the first person to receive an ISU honorary doctorate while in space
 Sergei Krikalev, Energya, Special Guest Lecturer
 Yang Liwei, CASC, Special Guest Lecturer
 Michel Tognini, CNES & ESA, Special Guest Lecturer
 Jessica Meir, NASA, alumna (MSS 2000)

References

External links
 
ISU Library public page on Netvibes
Dave Haslam about "25 years of the ISU" (YouTube Video) SpaceUp Stuttgart 2012
Space University takes off with the first international summer institute

Buildings and structures in Bas-Rhin
Education in Grand Est
Educational institutions established in 1987
1987 establishments in France